Tiruvannamalai railway station is a station of the Indian Railways system, station code TNM. It serves the city of Tiruvannamalai in the Indian state of Tamil Nadu.

Administration 
The station falls under the jurisdiction of Tiruchirappalli railway division in Southern Railway zone of Indian Railways.

Lines 
It is on the line connecting Katpadi Junction and Viluppuram Junction.

Location
This railway station is located off Bengaluru-Pondicherry road.

Infrastructure
This railways station is at an elevation of  699 ft. This railway station consists of three platforms and nine railway tracks. This railway station is electrified.

Notable places nearby
The most notable place is the Annamalaiyar Temple. Being built in the 700 AD, the station close to the temple.

References

Railway stations in Thiruvannamalai district
Transport in Tiruvannamalai